The ethnogenesis of the Talysh is a process of the formation of an Iranian-speaking people that took place in the south-eastern Transcaucasia and north-western Iran.

Background
Elucidation of ethnogenesis is associated with certain difficulties. First of all, it is a meager factual base that can be compensated for by materials of language, toponymy, mythology, historical legends, etc. The toponym "Talysh" is known from medieval Arabic sources, in particular, it is found in the Iranian historian al-Tabari, who designated the Talysh as "al-thailasan". Al-Tabari writes: "In the mountains around Azerbaijan lived such peoples as Gelae (one of the tribes of the ancient Cadusii) and al-Tailasan, who did not obey the Arabs and were free and independent." There are still many blank spots in the issue of the ethnogenesis of the Talysh. Unlike most of the peoples of the Caucasus, the genetic diversity of the northern Talysh is still practically not studied. There is only some information about the demographic structure and genetic polymorphism of haptoglobin, transferrin, group-specific component, and albumin in the Talysh of the village of Pirasora, Lerik region of Azerbaijan. Ancient and medieval tribes or peoples took part in the formation of the ethnic group represented by the Talysh. In antiquity, the territory of the Talysh was inhabited by the Iranian-speaking tribes of the Scythians, who were mentioned in the descriptions of the ancient Greeks under different names. One of these tribes was the Scythian Gelae, which the Greeks called the Cadusii, but according to other sources, Cadusii was the name for three tribes represented by the Aorsi, Dahae and Gelae. But Gelae are also often mentioned by ancient authors with Legae, from which the modern name of the city of Lerik in the Republic of Azerbaijan originates. The Talysh call Lerik as "Lik". The Scythian origin of the Talysh is also indicated by the name of the city Astara, which is given in the sources as the name of the Scythian goddess "Tara". We must also not forget about the results of archeology, which were carried out by Jacques de Morgan, where he gives the mounds of Lankaran and Astara a Scythian origin.

Genetics 
Longevity is widespread among the rural residents of the Talysh population, which is largely facilitated by the unpolluted habitat of the highlanders, moderate and often plant-based nutrition, and constant physical labor. During the expedition to the Talysh Mountains, there were no Talysh or Talysh people suffering from obesity. At the same time, the especially high life expectancy in individual families of Talysh makes us assume the presence of a genetic component of longevity. Population-genetic studies carried out in the village of Pirasora showed that none of the studied loci did not deviate from the Hardy-Weinberg equilibrium (the loci of haptoglobin HP, group-specific protein GC, transferrin TF, albumin Alb were studied). The distribution of allele frequencies in the Talysh population of Pirasora corresponds to that of Caucasoid populations. The average heterozygosity for all loci, equal to 0.17297, indicates a significant homozygosity of the Talysh population. As a result of studies, the gene frequencies of the Talysh population have shown that the genetic distance between the Talysh and Iranians of Shiraz is the smallest.

References 

History of Talysh
Talysh people
Talysh